The Pan-European Animal Planet is a feed of Animal Planet, which broadcasts to several countries in Europe, UK, Africa and the Middle East.

The channel is broadcast in English, Czech, Hungarian and formerly Russian. The HD feed also carries a Turkish audio track. Turkey has its own SD feed. The channel also carries DVB subtitle tracks in Arabic, Bulgarian, Croatian, Danish, Dutch, Finnish, French, Greek, Macedonian, Norwegian, Romanian, Serbian, Slovenian and Swedish.

There used to be a separate feed for Romania, but the channel closed down in 2013.

Many regions in Europe that previously received the pan-European version of the channel, now receive a localised version.
Animal Planet (Dutch TV channel) for The Netherlands and Flanders.
Animal Planet (German TV channel) for Germany, Austria, Liechtenstein and the German-speaking part of Switzerland. 
Animal Planet (Polish TV channel)
Animal Planet Russia
Animal Planet Turkey
Animal Planet (British TV channel) for the UK & Ireland

Ukraine and the Baltic countries still get the pan-European feed in Russian and English.

History

In October 2008, Animal Planet adopted the new branding and current logo.

In March 2009, the on-air logo changed its colour from green to white and became transparent.

On September 4, 2012, Animal Planet improved its picture quality by increasing the resolution from 544x576 to 720x576.

Since October 2012, all of the programming - including promos - is broadcast in Anamorphic widescreen picture format.

On 31 December 2017, Animal Planet ceased broadcasting in Africa on DStv

Currently, Animal Planet is ad-free on its main feed. Some countries, like Romania and Moldova, get localised ad blocks.
Animal Planet Italy for Italy and the Italian-speaking part of Switzerland ceased broadcasting on 31 January 2019 after a new distribution agreement between Discovery and Sky Italia.

On 9 March 2022, Discovery Inc. closed Animal Planet in Russia due to Russia's invasion of Ukraine.

Programming 
 After Dark
 Animal Battlegrounds
 Baby Planet
 Bad Dog
 Cats 101
 Dark Days in Monkey City
 Dogs 101
 Galapagos
 Growing Up...
 I'm Alive
 Killer Wales
 Max's Big Tracks
 Must Love Cats
 Penguin Safari
 Rescue Vet
 Safari Vet School
 Search for the Knysna elephants
 Shamwari: A Wild Life
 Talk to the Animals
 The Magic of The Big Blue
 Trophy Cats
 Wild Africa Rescue
 Wild Animal Orphans
 Wild France
 Wildest Islands
 Wildest Islands of Indonesia
 Wildlife SOS
 World Wild Wet

References

Europe
Television channels in North Macedonia
Warner Bros. Discovery EMEA